William Martin (born 1839, date of death unknown) was a Union Navy sailor in the American Civil War and a recipient of the U.S. military's highest decoration, the Medal of Honor, for his actions at the Battle of Forts Jackson and St. Philip.

Born in 1839 in Ireland, Martin immigrated to the United States and was living in New York when he joined the U.S. Navy. At the Battle of Forts Jackson and St. Philip near New Orleans on April 24, 1862, Varuna was rammed twice by the Confederate steamer  (formerly known as the Charles Morgan) and eventually sunk. Martin acted as a gun captain and was "cool and courageous" throughout the close-range fight. For this action, he was awarded the Medal of Honor a year later, on April 3, 1863.

Martin's official Medal of Honor citation reads:
The President of the United States of America, in the name of Congress, takes pleasure in presenting the Medal of Honor to Seaman William Martin, United States Navy, for extraordinary heroism in action, serving as Captain of a gun on board the U.S.S. Varuna during an attack on Forts Jackson and St. Philip, Louisiana, 24 April 1862. His ship was taken under furious fire by the rebel Morgan and severely damaged by ramming. Steadfast at his station through the thickest of the fight, Seaman Martin inflicted damage on the enemy, remaining cool and courageous although the Varuna, so badly damaged that she was forced to beach, was finally sunk.

See also

 List of American Civil War Medal of Honor recipients
 USS Varuna
 Battle of Forts Jackson and St. Philip

Notes/references

Bibliography

External links
 Naval History and Heritage Command - Civil War
 The Navies of the Civil War

1839 births
Year of death unknown
Irish emigrants to the United States (before 1923)
Irish sailors in the United States Navy
People of New York (state) in the American Civil War
Union Navy sailors
Irish-born Medal of Honor recipients
United States Navy Medal of Honor recipients
American Civil War recipients of the Medal of Honor